Champs-sur-Marne is a commune in the eastern suburbs of Paris, France.

The commune of Champs-sur-Marne is part of the Val Maubuée sector, one of the four sectors in the "new town" of Marne-la-Vallée.

History
Originally called simply Champs, the name of the commune became officially Champs-sur-Marne (meaning "Fields upon Marne") on 9 April 1962.

Demographics
The inhabitants are often referred to as Campésiens.

Twin towns – sister cities

Champs-sur-Marne is twinned with:
 Bradley Stoke, England, United Kingdom
 Quart de Poblet, Spain

Transport
Champs-sur-Marne is served by Noisy – Champs station on Paris RER line .

Education 

 the commune has ten preschools with 1,138 students combined, and ten elementary schools with 1,729 students combined.

The commune has three junior high schools, Armand Lanoux, Jean Weiner, and Pablo Picasso; and there is an additional junior high school in a surrounding commune, Le Luzard in Noisiel. There are 1,799 junior high school students combined. The commune has one senior high school, Lycée René Descartes.

Nearby senior high schools:
 Lycée Gérard de Nerval (Noisiel)
 Lycée technique René Cassin (Noisiel)
 Lycée Jean Moulin (Torcy)
There are also vocational high schools in Chelles, Thorigny, and Torcy.

Tertiary education:
 École des ponts ParisTech

See also
Communes of the Seine-et-Marne department

References

External links

Official website 
1999 Land Use, from IAURIF (Institute for Urban Planning and Development of the Paris-Île-de-France région) 
 

Communes of Seine-et-Marne
Val Maubuée